Elophila nigrolinealis is a moth in the family Crambidae. It was described by Pryer in 1877. It is found in China (Shanghai) and Japan.

References

Acentropinae
Moths described in 1877
Moths of Asia
Moths of Japan